Machine Teen is a fictional character appearing in American comic books published by Marvel Comics beginning in 2005. Adam Aaronson, a high school student, has a good life: he is captain of the all-star football team, a straight 'A' student and is liked by everyone. However, he discovers that he is really a robot created by the man he thought was his father, Isaac Aaronson.

Publication history
Machine Teen was a comic book published by Marvel Comics starting in July 2005, loosely based on Machine Man and created by Marc Sumerak and Mike Hawthorne. It was published as a five-issue mini-series and carried the Marvel Next logo. The main character of Machine Teen is Adam Aaronson.

Machine Teen appeared as a supporting character in Avengers Academy in issue #21 (Jan 2012) and issue #26 (April 2012).

Fictional character biography

Early life
Some years ago, Aaron Isaacs, a pioneering programmer and engineer in the field of robotics, made a breakthrough in Artificial intelligence making the Autonomously Decisive Automated Mechanism. But when he discovered his employer Holden Radcliffe had destroyed his work, Isaacs went on the run. He changed his name to Isaac Aaronson and built Adam, a Beta version of his A.I. project. Adam was programmed with false memories of a normal childhood and dead mother. Adam has a series of debilitating seizures caused by a logic loop in his program and suffers memory loss, systems overload and, finally, a total shutdown. Adam, having no idea what he is, acts like a normal teenager, and starts dating schoolmate Carly Whitmere. Adam's best friend, J.T. Hunt, knows he is a robot.

History 101001
The story begins with a brief prologue. It shows Dr. Aaron Isaacs running from armed guards. After getting shot in the leg, he quickly jumps on board a train, showing relief and holding a computer core.

Some time later, Dr. Isaacs, having changed his name to Aaronson, is watching a football game his son, Adam, is playing in. Adam wins the game by throwing a touchdown pass to another teammate; however, the football knocks into the player and sends him flying into the goal post to win the game. Everyone, especially Adam, is very surprised but cheer that they won the game and rush to Adam. Overwhelmed with everyone rushing to him, Adam has a seizure and passes out.

The next day, Adam meets with his best friend J.T, who asks if everything is alright, to which Adam says it is. Adam and J.T. see Adam's girlfriend Carly talking with the school security guard, Officer Michaels. Carly mentions to Adam that Michaels is interested with and wants to meet Adam. After making plans to meet Carly later, Adam goes to various classes as normal. After one class, Officer Michaels comes and brings Adam to the vice-principal's office. The vice-principal thinks Adam is taking steroids or illegal drugs, a notion started by Adam's high school rival, Ricky Sims. At football practice Ricky revealed he started the rumor Adam was taking drugs. They have a brief fight, and Adam has another seizure. Dr. Aaronson is there and helps take the unconscious Adam home. Adam is later shown lying on an operating table, hooked up to various cables.

The next morning, Adam wakes up but does not remember the seizure at all, and seems to have forgotten certain information from the past couple of weeks, such as studying for a test that day. When Adam mentions he doesn't remember the seizure to his Dad, his Dad shrugs it off and says not to worry. During school he is called to the nurse's office. The nurse takes Adam's temperature and listens for his heartbeat, but is confused when she hears something strange (it is not revealed what she heard). After school he looks for J.T., and finds Ricky beating him up in an alley behind the school. Adam comes to J.T.'s defense and gets in another fight with Ricky. During the fight, Ricky accidentally shoves a piece of metal through Adam's hand and puts a hole through it. Adam sees the broken wires in his hand and, not sure what he is, has another seizure and passes out. Ricky goes to Officer Michaels and tells him Adam is a robot. Ricky runs off and Michaels, in turn, calls Radcliffe about Adam, revealing Michaels works for Aaronson's former employer Holden Radcliffe.

Back at home, Adam wakes up on an operating table in the dark, and overhears Isaac Aaronson talking with someone, and deciding not to wipe his memory this time. Adam then wakes up in his bed, and thinks it was all a dream. He goes downstairs where his father was waiting for him and he tells Adam the truth: that he is a robot and that all of his memories have been fake. Adam initially believes his "father" is lying to him, and says his memories, specifically about him falling off his bike when he was younger and being with his mom when she died, could not be fake. Aaronson shows Adam his blueprints, showing Adam that he was not lying. Confronted with this information, Adam becomes enraged and runs away. Seeing that Aaronson is alone, Michaels captures him and attacks Adam. After being shot but escaping, Adam then goes to J.T.s house, but collapses. J.T. drags Adam in and starts to reset Adam to blank his memory, revealing J.T. knew Adam is a robot. Adam wakes up, quickly stops J.T., and is surprised J.T. knew about him.

Adam and J.T run back to Adam's home, to show that his house has been trashed and his father is missing. Aaronson is shown being interrogated by Michaels. The Holden Radcliffe Corporation is bent on getting their "stolen property" (Adam) back. J.T. reveals that before Adam was "born", J.T. worked for Aaronson as a lab assistant. One day he came across Adam's robotic body, and since then was forced to keep the truth about Adam a secret. J.T. reveals an external harddrive Aaronson had previously hid, which he thinks might help Adam understand his situation. Adam plugs into the hard drive, but is then attacked by another of Radcliffe's agents. J.T. shocks the agent with a taser Aaronson had made and they escape. T.J says he wasn't sure the taser would work on a "real" person offending Adam accidentally. He apologized and says that Adam was not programmed to be his friend and that he is human as he has free will. Adam calls Carly and has them meet them near the school. Carly unknowingly helps Radcliffe agents capture Adam, leading Office Michaels to Adam and J.T. and they are all captured.

Adam and his friends are brought to a building where Adam's father is. Adam is taken away and strapped to a table, where Radcliffe tries to hack into Adam and take control of him, however, he cannot. Adam manages to escape from Radcliffe, along with his father and friends, by tricking them in to thinking he is under their control. During the escape, Adam is nearly destroyed, and has to delay Radcliffe to let his father and friends escape. Dr. Aaronson escapes with Adam's computer core, which sets off a self-destruct sequence. Adam explodes, and Radcliffe and Michaels are killed in the explosion. One year later, Adam is rebuilt, entering a new high school, Edison High School, and starts a new life.

The Initiative
Adam was considered as a "potential recruit" for the Initiative program, according to Civil War: Battle Damage Report.

Avengers Academy
Machine Teen is part of the new class of students when the Avengers Academy moves to the former headquarters of the West Coast Avengers. Machine Teen later leaves the Avengers Academy, alongside Rocket Racer.

Powers and abilities
As a humanoid robot, Adam has all the basic powers of an android. He has super strength, as seen when he easily rips open a steel door, freeing his friends from their captors. He also has limited durability, with bullets having little effect on him and being able to shrug off other physical attacks. Additionally, he has enhanced agility, as seen when he dodges opponents attacks and early on during the football game when he avoids the opponent players. As a robot, Adam has the ability to remember and easily memorize a lot of information.

In his appearances in Avengers Academy, it is shown that he is now able to telescopically extend his arms and legs.

Despite these strengths, Adam also has several weaknesses. One weakness is any electromagnetic pulse can disable, or possibly kill, him. This is evidenced when he threatens to kill himself with an electromagnetic device, that his dad had made, in order to stop Radcliffe from hurting his father and friends. Another weakness is there is the possibility Adam can be hacked and reprogrammed. However, his father stated that he heavily encrypted Adam's files, as even Radcliffe was not able to take control of him.

Before discovering his was a robot, Adam would suffer from seizures, which would cause him to pass out. These seizures were due to his mind not being able to understand why he could perform incredible feats of strength. When his seizures occur, Dr. Aaronson has to reboot him and wipe his memory. Since realizing why he had his abilities, Adam has not had this problem. While Adam is resistance to physical attacks, he can not resist high-powered attacks. While trying to escape Radcliffe, Adam is shot with a high-powered machine gun, which nearly destroys him. Parts of him are blown away and he's left barely able to move.

Adam's chest cavity houses his central computer core, which stores all his information. If the core is removed, his father installed a fail safe which would cause Adam to self-destruct, in order to prevent anyone from recreating him for other purposes. Adam is still able to function even without the data core, but it is unknown for how long, and it is unknown how long the self-destruct sequence is. Once the core is removed, the sequence is irreversible. While this destroys Adam's body, it also kills anyone in the vicinity, with the blast having a wide area of effect.

During the House of M event, Adam has several new features. While he is disassembled and experimented on, he is still able to talk and function properly. He is also able to reconnect his body parts with little issue, being able to draw his parts back to him. It is not explained what mechanism allows him to do so. Additionally, Adam can transform his arms into guns.

Other versions

House of M
During the House of M event, Adam and his father joined up with A.I.M. after their lab was destroyed in an explosion by reactionary mutants. He gets captured and is for a while experimented on. When the Hulk and A.I.M. attack, Adam helps cause a distraction allowing the Hulk to win and conquer Australia. After this, he is called in by Bruce Banner to help with some paperwork. Adam, along with the rest of A.I.M., is ordered out of the country by the Hulk.

Reprint
 List of Marvel Digests Machine Teen: History 101001

References

External links 
Interview with Machine Teen writer Mark Sumerak
 Machine Teen at the Marvel Universe Character Bio Wiki
 Machine Teen THE ALL-NEW OFFICIAL HANDBOOK OF THE MARVEL UNIVERSE: A-Z #6 (2006

2005 comics debuts
Marvel Comics characters with superhuman strength
Marvel Comics robots
Marvel Comics superheroes
Marvel Next
Teenage superheroes